Sheet-Glass Works Convention, 1934 (shelved) is  an International Labour Organization Convention established in 1934, with a preamble stating:

Ratifications
Prior to it being shelved, the convention was ratified by 13 states.

References

External links 
Text.
Ratifications.

Shelved International Labour Organization conventions
History of glass
Working time
Treaties concluded in 1934
Treaties entered into force in 1938
Glass industry